Caer Gwinntguic was a late antique / early medieval British kingdom which had its center in the Roman city Venta Belgarum (now Winchester, Hampshire) and the historic lands of the Belgae tribe. It acquired its own form of independence at the beginning of the fifth century as a result of the Rescript of Honorius, which left the inhabitants of the westernmost area of ​​the Saxon Shore to organize their own defense.

History 
 410 - The civitates of Britain revolt and expel the provincial and diocese magistrates loyal to the Imperial usurper Constantine III.
  - Possibly reign of Elafius / Elaf, mentioned by Saint Germanus who convinced the sovereign to renounce the heresy of Pelagius to embrace Roman Catholicism. 
 c. 465 - The Jutes from Kent invaded today's western Southampton, while the Meonware settled in the eastern area, merging with the Saxons in the early sixth century
 c. 495 - ca 525 - Faced with the advance of the invaders and the founding of the kingdom of Wessex by Cerdic, Venta Belgarum blocked its south gate
 c. 508 - Natan / Natanlaod / Nudd was killed by the Saxons of Wessex
 508 - Saxons of Wessex defeated the Britons of Natanlaod at Southampton Water
 552 - Caer Gwinntguic falls to or is assimilated into the Kingdom of Wessex, who settled on the borders of the kingdom of

See also  
Belgae
Anglo-Saxons
Angles
Saxons
Frisians
Jutes
Britannia
Britons
Romano-British
Anglo-Saxon heptarchy
England
History of England

References 

 
Roman Britain
Late antiquity